Mount Lincoln may refer to one of various mountains located in the United States: